In additive combinatorics, a Šindel sequence is a periodic sequence of integers with the property that its partial sums include all of the triangular numbers. For instance, the sequence that begins 1, 2, 3, 4, 3, 2 is a Šindel sequence, with the triangular partial sums

etc. Another way of describing such a sequence is that it can be partitioned into contiguous subsequences whose sums are the consecutive integers:

This particular example is used in the gearing of the Prague astronomical clock, as part of a mechanism for chiming the clock's bells the correct number of times at each hour. The Šindel sequences are named after Jan Šindel, a Czech scientist in the 14th and 15th centuries whose calculations were used in the design of the Prague clock. The definition and name of these sequences were given by Michal Křížek, Alena Šolcová, and Lawrence Somer, in their work analyzing the mathematics of the Prague clock.

If all of these triangular numbers are partial sums of the sequence, then all larger triangular numbers will be as well.

In the Prague clock, an auxiliary gear with slots spaced at intervals of 1, 2, 3, 4, 3, and 2 units (repeating in the example Šindel sequence in each of its rotations) is synchronized with and regulates the motion of another larger gear whose slots are spaced at intervals of 1, 2, 3, 4, 5, ..., 24 units, revolving once a day with its spacing controlling the number of chimes on each hour. In order to keep these two gears synchronized, it is important that, for every revolution of the large gear, the small gear also revolves an integer number of times. Mathematically, this means that the sum  of the period of the Šindel sequence must evenly divide , the sum of spacing intervals of the large gear. For this reason it is of interest to find Šindel sequences with a given period sum . In connection with this problem, a primitive Šindel sequence, is a Šindel sequence no two of whose numbers can be replaced by their sum, forming a shorter Šindel sequence. Note however, that this sequence may be formed by repeating a shorter Šindel sequence more than one time.

A sequence that just repeats the number 1, with any period, is a Šindel sequence, and is called the trivial Šindel sequence. If  is a power of two, then the trivial Šindel sequence with period   is primitive, and is the unique primitive Šindel sequence with period sum .

See also
Sparse ruler

Notes

References

Additive combinatorics